Living in the Background is the debut album of Italy-based act Baltimora, released in 1985.

Overview
Jimmy McShane supposedly performed the lead vocals, although there is some controversy surrounding who the actual singer is, while the songs were written by Maurizio Bassi and Naimy Hackett. "Tarzan Boy," the first single released from the album became an international success, peaking at #13 on the U.S. Billboard Hot 100 chart, and at #3 in the United Kingdom. "Woody Boogie" and "Living in the Background" were also released as singles, with the latter becoming the group's only other song to crack the Billboard Hot 100, peaking at #87 on the chart.

The album has been released with at least three different covers. The well-known cover features Jimmy McShane jumping in the air on a red background with black text. The text is an extract from a prose poem by French poet Stéphane Mallarmé, "Le Phénomène Futur" (The Future Phenomenon). 

The album has also been released and re-released in various forms, though none of these different versions of the album seem to correlate with any particular one of the various album covers. A bonus track from one of these later pressings of the album, "Juke Box Boy" was also released as a single.

The original CD issue of Living in the Background, from 2003, is out-of-print. An Italian CD release was issued in 2005, and that same year an unofficial Russian release circulated too.

Track listing

Certifications

Personnel
 Maurizio Bassi - keyboards, piano, lead vocals
 Leandro Gaetano - keyboards, Fairlight CMI programming, PPG Wave 2.3, Xpander, Yamaha synthesizer
 Claudio Bazzari, Giorgio Cocilovo - electric guitars
 Claudio Pascoli - saxophone
 Pier Michelatti - bass
 Gabriele Melotti - drums, Linn Programmer Simmons EDS 7
 Moreno Ferrara, Malcom Charlton, Silvano Fossati, Naimy Hackett, Lella Esposito, Jimmy McShane, Silver Pozzoli - backing vocals

Production
 Maurizio Bassi - producer, arrangement
 Jurgen Koppers - mixing
 Paolo Mescoli - recorded by

Other
 Michele Bernardi - cover illustration
 Martin Beckett - photography (UK edition)

Charts

References

External links
"Living in The Background" playlist of auto-generated audio and VEVO videos on YouTube

1985 debut albums
Baltimora albums
Manhattan Records albums